Major Thomas Guy Frederick Paget (29 July 1886 – 12 March 1952), was a British soldier and Conservative Party politician.

Paget was the son of Thomas Guy Paget, of Ibstock, Leicestershire. His great-grandfather Thomas Paget, of Lubenham, was a banker and represented Leicestershire in Parliament while his great-uncle, also named Thomas Paget, represented Leicestershire South and Harborough. Paget sat as Member of Parliament for Bosworth from 1922 to 1923.

During the 1922 general election campaign, Paget stood on an anti-German platform. Historians such as M.S.R. Kinnear have suggested that this position resonated with the Bosworth electorate. He gained 40.9% of the vote.

Paget also wrote historical biographies of Medieval women, The Rose of Raby (about Cecily Neville), The Rose of London (about Jane Shore) and The Rose of Rouen (about Elizabeth Woodville).

Paget died in March 1952, aged 65. His son Reginald was also a politician, for the Labour Party.

References

External links

The National Archives
 

1886 births
1952 deaths
Conservative Party (UK) MPs for English constituencies
UK MPs 1922–1923
Deputy Lieutenants of Leicestershire